Stéphane Dondon (born 9 January 1977 in Melun, France) is a French basketball player who played for French Pro A league clubs Vichy, Chalon/Saône and Cholet between 2002 and 2008. He played college basketball in the United States for Collin County Community College and the University of Virginia.

References

Sportspeople from Melun
1977 births
Living people
Cholet Basket players
French men's basketball players
French expatriate basketball people in the United States
Junior college men's basketball players in the United States
Virginia Cavaliers men's basketball players